The de Sitter effect was described by Willem de Sitter in 1913  (as well as by Daniel Frost Comstock in 1910) and used to support the special theory of relativity against a competing 1908 emission theory by Walther Ritz that postulated a variable speed of light dependent on the velocity of the emitting object. De Sitter showed what Ritz's theory have predicted that the orbits of binary stars would appear more eccentric than consistent with experiment and with the laws of mechanics, however, the experimental result was negative. This was confirmed by Brecher in 1977 by observing the x-rays spectrum. For other experiments related to special relativity, see tests of special relativity.

The effect

If there are no complicating dragging effects, the light would then be expected to move at this same speed until it eventually reached an observer.
 
In 1913, Willem de Sitter argued that if this was true, a star orbiting in a double-star system would usually, with regard to us, alternate between moving towards us and away from us. Light emitted from different parts of the orbital path would travel towards us at different speeds. For a nearby star with a small orbital velocity (or whose orbital plane was almost perpendicular to our line of view) this might merely make the star's orbit seem erratic, but for a sufficient combination of orbital speed and distance (and inclination), the "fast" light given off during approach would be able to catch up with and even overtake "slow" light emitted earlier during a recessional part of the star's orbit, and the star would present an image that was scrambled and out of sequence. That is, Kepler's laws of motion would apparently be violated for a distant observer.

De Sitter made a study of double stars and found no cases where the stars' computed orbits appeared non-Keplerian. Since the total flight-time difference between "fast" and "slow" lightsignals would be expected to scale linearly with distance in simple emission theory, and the study would (statistically) have included stars with a reasonable spread of distances and orbital speeds and orientations, de Sitter concluded that the effect should have been seen if the model was correct, and its absence meant that the emission theory was almost certainly wrong.

Notes
 Modern experiments of the de Sitter type refute the idea that light might travel at a speed that was partially dependent on the velocity of the emitter (c'=c + kv), where the emitter's velocity v can be positive or negative, and k is a factor between 0 and 1, denoting the extent to which the speed of light depends on the source velocity. De Sitter established an upper limit of k < 0.002, but extinction effects make that result suspect.
 De Sitter's experiment was criticized because of extinction effects by J. G. Fox. That is, during their flight to Earth, the light rays would have been absorbed and re-emitted by interstellar matter nearly at rest relative to Earth, so that the speed of light should become constant with respect to Earth, regardless of the motion of the original source(s).
 In 1977, Kenneth Brecher published the results of a similar double-survey, and reached a similar conclusion - that any apparent irregularities in double-star orbits were too small to support the emission theory. Contrary to de Sitter, he observed the x-ray spectrum, thereby eliminating possible influences of the extinction effect.
 There are also terrestrial experiments that speak against such theories, see experiments testing emission theories.

References

Physics experiments
1913 in science